Viktor Berezhnyi (born 20 February 1961) is a Ukrainian former basketball player. He competed in the men's tournament at the 1992 Summer Olympics.

References

External links
 

1961 births
Living people
Soviet men's basketball players
1990 FIBA World Championship players
Ukrainian men's basketball players
Olympic basketball players of the Unified Team
Basketball players at the 1992 Summer Olympics
Basketball players from Kyiv
PBC CSKA Moscow players
Türk Telekom B.K. players
Ukrainian expatriate basketball people in Turkey